Phostria tetrastictalis is a moth in the family Crambidae. It was described by George Hampson in 1912. It is found in Nigeria.

References

Endemic fauna of Nigeria
Phostria
Moths described in 1912
Moths of Africa